WHNR (1360 kHz) is a commercial AM radio station licensed to Cypress Gardens, Florida, and serving the Lakeland - Winter Haven area of Central Florida.  The station airs a Variety Hits radio format and is owned by Ferris Waller, through licensee Walco Enterprises, LLC.  WHNR is part of a four-station simulcast, including 1170 WKFL Bushnell, 1330 WWAB Lakeland and 1390 WAVP Avon Park.

By day, WHNR broadcasts with 5,000 watts, but to protect other stations on 1360 AM, it reduces power to 2,500 watts at night.  It uses a directional antenna with a three-tower array.

History
On , the station signed on the air as WINT.  That call sign stood for WINTer Haven, its original city of license.  WINT was a daytimer, transmitting with 1,000 watts by day but required to go off the air at night.  It played Top 40 music.

In 1972 the station changed its call sign to WZNG playing an Oldies format.  On November 2, 1983, the station changed its call sign to WYXY playing an Adult Contemporary format.

On March 16, 1990, the station changed its call sign to the current WHNR playing a mix of Adult Standards and Soft Adult Contemporary music.  The station was silent for a time in 1995 before moving to an Urban Adult Contemporary format under the branding "Power 1360, the Soul of Central Florida".

In 1996, the station flipped to a Regional Mexican format under the branding "La Poderosa" (The Power).  In 2010, the station began to air classic country from 7PM to 6AM.

Ferris Waller's Walco Enterprises, LLC, of Plant City, Florida, made a deal to buy WHNR from Catco Communications in early December 2017. FCC approval was granted in July 2018. Waller owns several businesses in the Plant City area. The station is now being branded as "Boss Hogg Radio" and is playing a variety hits format known as "Heinz 57 Music."  It includes classic country and oldies.  The station built a remote radio studio at the Plant City Farm & Flea Market.

References

External links

HNR
Radio stations established in 1983
1983 establishments in Florida